Union Volunteers were a Humboldt County Volunteer Militia unit organized in Union during the Bald Hills War.  They were in existence during 1862.

References

Military history of California
Bald Hills War
Humboldt County, California
Arcata, California
1862 establishments in California